Classic Christmas is the third Christmas album and 65th overall album by American country singer Johnny Cash, released on Columbia Records in 1980 (see 1980 in music). Unlike The Christmas Spirit or Family Christmas, none of the songs are originals; all are traditional Christmas songs. It is the third full-length Christmas album by Cash. A fourth Christmas album Country Christmas recorded and released in 1991 for the Delta Music label featuring rerecordings of many of the songs on Classic Christmas.

Track listing

Personnel
 Johnny Cash - vocals, arrangements
 The Bill Walker Orchestra - orchestra
The Bill Walker Choir - chorus
Bill Walker - arrangements, conductor
Technical
Ron Reynolds - engineer
Elizabeth Barker White - cover art

References

External links
 Luma Electronic's Johnny Cash discography listing

Johnny Cash albums
1980 Christmas albums
Christmas albums by American artists
Columbia Records Christmas albums
Country Christmas albums